Events in 2010 in Japanese television.

Events
September 24: Analog television broadcasts shut down in the towns of Suzu and Noto in Ishikawa Prefecture.

Debuts

Ongoing
Music Fair, music (1964–present)
Mito Kōmon, jidaigeki (1969-2011)
Sazae-san, anime (1969–present)
FNS Music Festival, music (1974–present)
Panel Quiz Attack 25, game show (1975–present)
Soreike! Anpanman. anime (1988–present)
Downtown no Gaki no Tsukai ya Arahende!!, game show (1989–present)
Crayon Shin-chan, anime (1992–present)
Nintama Rantarō, anime (1993–present)
Chibi Maruko-chan, anime (1995–present)
Detective Conan, anime (1996–present)
SASUKE, sports (1997–present)
Ojarumaru, anime (1998–present)
One Piece, anime (1999–present)
Sgt. Frog, anime (2004-2011)
Bleach, anime (2004-2012)
Doraemon, anime (2005–present)
Naruto Shippuden, anime (2007–2017)
Kitty's Paradise peace, children's variety (2008-2011)
Yu-Gi-Oh! 5D's, anime (2008-2011)
Dragon Ball Kai, anime (2009-2011)
Tamagotchi!, anime (2009-2012)
Fairy Tail, anime (2009-2013)

Endings

Deaths

See also
 2010 in anime
 2010 Japanese television dramas
 2010 in Japan
 2010 in Japanese music
 List of Japanese films of 2010

References